Joseph Crovetto (17 December 1889 – 27 March 1964) was a Monegasque gymnast. He competed in the men's artistic individual all-around event at the 1920 Summer Olympics.

References

1889 births
1964 deaths
Monegasque male artistic gymnasts
Olympic gymnasts of Monaco
Gymnasts at the 1920 Summer Olympics
Place of birth missing